"Mi último adiós" is a poem written by Filipino propagandist and writer Dr. José Rizal before his execution by firing squad on December 30, 1896. The piece was one of the last notes he wrote before his death. Another that he had written was found in his shoe, but because the text was illegible, its contents remain a mystery.

Rizal did not ascribe a title to his poem. Mariano Ponce, his friend and fellow reformist, titled it "Mi último pensamiento" ("My Last Thought") in the copies he distributed, but this did not catch on. Also, the "coconut oil lamp" containing the poem was not delivered to the Rizal's family until after the execution as it was required to light the cell.

Background
"On the afternoon of Dec. 29, 1896, a day before his execution, Dr. José Rizal was visited by his mother, Teodora Alonzo; sisters Lucia, Josefa, Trinidád, Maria and Narcisa; and two nephews. When they took their leave, Rizal told Trinidád in English that there was something in the small alcohol stove (cocinilla), as opposed to saying coconut oil lamp (lamparilla), which was intended provide cover for the transportation of the text. The stove was given to Narcisa by the guard when the party was about to board their carriage in the courtyard. At home, the Rizal ladies recovered a folded paper from the stove. On it was written an unsigned, untitled and undated poem of 14 five-line stanzas. The Rizals reproduced copies of the poem and sent them to Rizal's friends in the country and abroad. In 1897, Mariano Ponce in Hong Kong had the poem printed with the title "Mí último pensamiento". Fr. Mariano Dacanay, who received a copy of the poem while a prisoner in Bilibid (jail), published it in the first issue of La Independencia on September 25, 1898 with the title 'Ultimo Adios'."

Political impact
After it was annexed by the United States as a result of the Spanish–American War, the Philippines was perceived as a community of "barbarians" incapable of self-government. U.S. Representative Henry A. Cooper, lobbying for management of Philippine affairs, recited the poem before the United States Congress. Realising the nobility of the piece's author, his fellow congressmen enacted the Philippine Bill of 1902 enabling self-government (later known as the Philippine Organic Act of 1902), despite the fact that the 1882 Chinese Exclusion Act was still in effect and African Americans had yet to be granted equal rights as US citizens. It created the Philippine Assembly, appointed two Filipino delegates to the American Congress, extended the US Bill of Rights to Filipinos, and laid the foundation for an autonomous government. The colony was on its way to independence. Full autonomy would not be granted until 4 July 1946 by the Treaty of Manila.

Indonesian nationalism
The poem was translated into Indonesian by Rosihan Anwar and was recited by Indonesian soldiers before going into battle during their struggle for independence.
 
Anwar recalled the circumstances of the translation:

He read "Mi último adiós" over radio in Jakarta on Saturday, 30 December 1944–the 48th anniversary of Rizal's death. That same day, the paper Asia Raja devoted almost half of its back page to a feature and poem on Rizal written by Anwar, accompanied by Anwar's translation.

Poem

Translations

"Mi último adiós" is interpreted into 46 Philippine languages, including Filipino Sign Language, and as of 2005 at least 35 English translations known and published (in print). The most popular English iteration is the 1911 translation of Charles Derbyshire and is inscribed on bronze. Also on bronze at the Rizal Park in Manila, but less known, is the 1944 one of novelist Nick Joaquin. The latest translation is in Czech by former Czech ambassador to the Republic of the Philippines, Jaroslav Ludva, and addressed at the session of the Senát. In 1927, Luis G. Dato translated the poem, from Spanish to English, in rhymes. Dato called it "Mí último pensamiento". Dato was the first Filipino to translate the poem.

See also
Death poem
"Sa Aking Mga Kabata"

References

Sung by various Artists of Spanish language as a Tribute (more information needed!)

Original Ultimo Adios Manuscript
Modern English translation by Edwin Agustín Lozada, May 2001

Resources
Full Text in Spanish (Mi último adiós)
Full Text in Tagalog (Huling paalam)
Full Text in English (My last farewell)
Spanish to English Comparison by Luis G. Dato

1896 poems
Farewell addresses
Filipino poems
Philippine Revolution
Spanish-language poems
Works by José Rizal